Bathynomus yucatanensis is a species of aquatic crustacean, of the order Isopoda. It is a member of the giant isopods (Bathynomus), and it is related—albeit distantly—to shrimps and crabs, and more closely to woodlouse.  It is the third giant isopod discovered in the Gulf of Mexico and was first mistaken for Bathynomus giganteus, to which is it closely related.  It is approx. 10 inches long and 5 inches wide.  The discovery was announced in August 2022.

References

External links

Cymothoida
Crustaceans of the Atlantic Ocean
Crustaceans described in 2022